is a passenger railway station in located in the town of Kushimoto, Higashimuro District, Wakayama Prefecture, Japan, operated by West Japan Railway Company (JR West). It is the southernmost railway station on Honshū.

Lines

Station layout
The station consists of one island platform and one side platform connected to the station building by a footbridge. The station is staffed.

Platforms

Adjacent stations

|-
!colspan=5|West Japan Railway Company (JR West)

History
Kushimoto Station opened on December 11, 1936. The current station building was completed in December 1979. With the privatization of the Japan National Railways (JNR) on April 1, 1987, the station came under the aegis of the West Japan Railway Company.

Passenger statistics
In fiscal 2019, the station was used by an average of 328 passengers daily (boarding passengers only).

Surrounding Area
 Kushimoto Town Hall
 Kushimoto Municipal Kushimoto Elementary School
 Kushimoto Municipal Kushimoto Junior High School
 Kushimoto Municipal Hospital
 Wakayama Prefectural Kushimoto High School
 Kushimoto Town Cultural Center

See also
List of railway stations in Japan

References

External links

 Kushimoto Station (West Japan Railway) 

Railway stations in Wakayama Prefecture
Railway stations in Japan opened in 1936
Kushimoto, Wakayama